The Campus Martius Museum interprets Ohio history.

Campus Martius was the second fortification in Marietta, Ohio and the first primarily for civilian defense.  The Rufus Putnam House, incorporated in the Museum, is the only remaining part of the fortification. The museum also includes the Ohio Company Land Office.  Both are National Register of Historic Places properties.  The site is designated as Campus Martius State Memorial.

The museum is located a block from the Ohio River Museum.

External links 
 Campus Martius Museum - Friends of the Museums 
 Ohio History Connection: Campus Martius

References 

History museums in Ohio
Museums in Washington County, Ohio
Buildings and structures in Marietta, Ohio
Ohio History Connection